Mount Don Pedro Christophersen is a massive, largely ice-covered, gabled mountain,  high, surmounting the divide between the heads of Axel Heiberg Glacier and Cooper Glacier, in the Queen Maud Mountains. It was discovered in 1911 by Roald Amundsen, who named it after Peter "Don Pedro" Christophersen, one of the expedition's chief supporters who lived in Buenos Aires.

References 

Mountains of the Ross Dependency
Dufek Coast